George Washington Paynter (July 6, 1871 – September 28, 1950) was an outfielder in Major League Baseball. He played for the St. Louis Browns in 1894.

References

External links

1871 births
1950 deaths
Major League Baseball outfielders
St. Louis Browns (NL) players
Lynchburg Hill Climbers players
Mobile Blackbirds players
Baseball players from Cincinnati
19th-century baseball players